Masini Situ-Kumbanga (born 21 October 1955) is a Congolese long-distance runner. He competed in the men's 5000 metres and the marathon at the 1984 Summer Olympics.

References

External links
 

1955 births
Living people
Athletes (track and field) at the 1984 Summer Olympics
Democratic Republic of the Congo male long-distance runners
Democratic Republic of the Congo male marathon runners
Olympic athletes of the Democratic Republic of the Congo
Place of birth missing (living people)
21st-century Democratic Republic of the Congo people